Tullamarine Bus Lines was a bus operator in Melbourne, Australia. It operated eight bus routes under contract to Public Transport Victoria. In addition, it also had a taxi management business called Cabways.

Tullamarine Bus Lines was sold to ComfortDelGro Australia on 1 May 2018 and its bus operations were integrated into its CDC Melbourne subsidiary.

History
Tullamarine Bus Lines was formed in May 1970 after the Spyrou and Sikavitsas families, that owned Kastoria Bus Lines, decided to go their separate ways. The Spyrou family took control of Kastoria Bus Lines with routes 475 and 476, and the Sikavitsas family took routes 477 and 479 to form Tullamarine Bus Lines.

In addition to its bus routes, Tullamarine Bus Lines also operated contracted school services and a small taxi management business called Cabways.

In May 2018, ComfortDelGro Australia acquired Tullamarine Bus Lines, with its six routes (477-479, 484, 490 and 543) and 36 buses, as well as its taxi management business. The bus business was rebranded CDC Tullamarine and integrated into CDC Melbourne in August 2018, while the taxi business was renamed CDC Fleet in November 2018.

Fleet
At the time operations ceased in April 2018, the fleet consisted of 36 Mercedes-Benz buses. The fleet livery was cream with burgundy stripes.

References

External links

Company website
Showbus gallery

Bus companies of Victoria (Australia)
Bus transport in Melbourne
ComfortDelGro companies
Transport companies established in 1970
Transport companies disestablished in 2018
1970 establishments in Australia
Australian companies established in 2018